Dreams Die at Dawn (Italian: I sogni muoiono all'alba) is a 1961 Italian drama film directed by Mario Craveri, Enrico Gras and Indro Montanelli. It is set during the Hungarian Revolution of 1956.

Cast
 Lea Massari as Anna Miklos 
 Ivo Garrani  as Andrea 
 Gianni Santuccio as Gianni 
 Aroldo Tieri  as Antonio 
 Mario Feliciani  as Mario 
 Renzo Montagnani as Sergio 
 Rina Centa as Ethel Miklos

References

Bibliography 
 Goble, Alan. The Complete Index to Literary Sources in Film. Walter de Gruyter, 1999.

External links 
 

1961 films
Italian drama films
1961 drama films
1960s Italian-language films
Films directed by Mario Craveri
Films directed by Enrico Gras
Films set in Budapest
Films set in 1956
1960s Italian films